is a Japanese professional footballer who plays as a defender for Vegalta Sendai.

References

External links

1996 births
Living people
Japanese footballers
Association football defenders
FC Gifu players
Vegalta Sendai players
J1 League players
J2 League players